Henry Augustus Levestam (1833 – 11 February 1889) was a 19th-century Member of Parliament from Nelson, New Zealand.

Early life
He was born in Böel, Schleswig-Holstein, when it was still part of Denmark in 1833, the son of Doctor Arnold Levestam and Henriette Fraenckel. Levestam's grandfather Matthias Levestam was born Moses Salomon Levi. In 1809 he was baptised in Moscow and took a new name.

Career
Levestam served his time at a Copenhagen engineering business. He then moved to London where he continued his mechanical studies.  In about 1855 he sailed on the steam ship Lord Ashley as second engineer.  The ship was one of the fleet belonging to New Zealand Steam Shipping Company.  He was transferred to the Airedale and sailed on her until he settled in Nelson.

He married Elizabeth Hargreaves, the daughter of one of Nelson's pioneer settlers in January 1861. They had eight children, four boys and four girls.

Shortly after his marriage he started the Soho Foundry with Mr Moutray. The partnership dissolved and Levestam established his own engineering concern off Collingwood Street.

Political career

In 1881, when Acton Adams resigned due to ill health, Levestam announced his candidature, supporting the Liberals. James Crowe Richmond stood against him, but Levestam won with a substantial majority. In the  he was opposed by Messrs Piper and Gibbs, but again was successfully re-elected. Despite English being his second language, Levestam was considered a fluent, although not eloquent, speaker in the house. He was also appreciated for his services by his electorate who, in January 1887, presented him with a purse of sovereigns as testimony of the esteem in which he was held by them.

He represented the City of Nelson electorate from 1881 to his death from a heart attack on 11 February 1889.

Public service
He was noted for listening to the concerns of others and helping those in need. He was a member of the Ancient Order of Foresters and supportive of other friendly societies.

Death
Levestam had been working in his shop on Collingwood Street. He headed home and once there complained of chest pains. He went to bed at 9pm and slept soundly till about 10pm when he awoke and almost immediately was seized with a fainting fit, from which however he recovered consciousness shortly before 11 pm. Levestam asked wife "Where am I". She told him she had sent for the doctor. He replied "Oh don't do that, I am better now" then sank back on his pillow and died.

He was not well off when he died and concern was expressed about his family's financial state.

References

1833 births
1889 deaths
Members of the New Zealand House of Representatives
Danish emigrants to New Zealand
New Zealand MPs for South Island electorates
19th-century New Zealand politicians